Allercombe is a hamlet in east Devon, England. It lies just south of the A30 road between the villages of Whimple and Aylesbeare.

Villages in Devon